In baseball statistics, an error is an act, in the judgment of the official scorer, of a fielder misplaying a ball in a manner that allows a batter or baserunner to advance one or more bases or allows an at bat to continue after the batter should have been put out. Third base is the third of four stations on a baseball diamond which must be touched in succession by a baserunner in order to score a run for that player's team. A third baseman, abbreviated 3B, is the player on the team playing defense who fields the area nearest third base, and is responsible for the majority of plays made at that base. The third baseman requires good reflexes in reacting to batted balls, often being the closest infielder (roughly 90–120 feet) to the batter. The third base position requires a strong and accurate arm, as the third baseman often makes long throws to first base. The third baseman sometimes must throw quickly to second base in time to start a double play, and must also field fly balls in both fair and foul territory. In the scoring system used to record defensive plays, the third baseman is assigned the number 5.

The list of career leaders is dominated by players from the 19th century, when fielding equipment was very rudimentary; baseball gloves only began to steadily gain acceptance in the 1880s, and were not uniformly worn until the mid-1890s, resulting in a much lower frequency of defensive miscues. The top 19 players in career errors all began playing in the 19th century, all but four of them playing their entire careers before 1900; none were active in the major leagues after 1911. Only two of the top 29 were active after 1929, and none were active after 1946. Through 2021, the top 129 single-season totals were all recorded before 1906, and only five of the top 316 were recorded after 1942. To a large extent, the leaders reflect longevity rather than lower skill. Ron Santo, who leads all post-1950 third basemen with 317 errors, won five Gold Glove Awards for fielding excellence.

Arlie Latham, who set a major league record with 1,573 career games at third base – none of them after 1896 – is the all-time leader in career errors committed as a third baseman with 822, more than twice as many as any player who reached the major leagues after 1900; he is the only third baseman to commit more than 700 career errors. Billy Nash, whose career ended in 1898 after setting the National League record for games at third base, is second all-time; he is the only other third baseman to commit more than 600 errors. Evan Longoria, who had 152 errors through the 2021 season to place him tied for 131st all-time, is the leader among active players.

Key

List

Other Hall of Famers

References

Baseball-Reference.com

Major League Baseball statistics
Major League Baseball lists